Humboldt is a city in Richardson County, Nebraska, United States. The population was 877 at the 2010 census.

History

Humboldt was platted in 1868. It was named after Humboldt, Tennessee, where an early settler had stayed while fighting in the Civil War.

In December 1993, Humboldt was the site of a triple murder, including the rape and murder of Brandon Teena, a transgender man.

Three Ball Charlie, pictured on the cover of The Rolling Stones' album "Exile on Main St.," grew up in Humboldt.

Geography

Demographics

2010 census
As of the census of 2010, there were 877 people, 385 households, and 213 families living in the city. The racial makeup of the city was 97.1% White, 0.5% African American, 1.7% Native American, 0.2% from other races, and 0.5% from two or more races. Hispanic or Latino people of any race were 1.4% of the population.

There were 385 households, of which 23.1% had children under the age of 18 living with them, 45.2% were married couples living together, 7.3% had a female householder with no husband present, 2.9% had a male householder with no wife present, and 44.7% were non-families. 40.8% of all households were made up of individuals, and 19% had someone living alone who was 65 years of age or older. The average household size was 2.15 and the average family size was 2.87.

The median age in the city was 48.6 years. 21.4% of residents were under the age of 18; 5.1% were between the ages of 18 and 24; 18.8% were from 25 to 44; 26.3% were from 45 to 64; and 28.5% were 65 years of age or older. The gender makeup of the city was 47.1% male and 52.9% female.

2000 census
As of the census of 2000, there were 941 people, 427 households, and 239 families living in the city. The population density was 703.5 people per square mile (271.1/km2). There were 508 housing units at an average density of 379.8 per square mile (146.4/km2). The racial makeup of the city was 96.17% White, 0.64% African American, 2.02% Native American, 0.11% Asian, 0.21% from other races, and 0.85% from two or more races. Hispanic or Latino people of any race were 1.81% of the population.

There were 427 households, out of which 23.0% had children under the age of 18 living with them, 44.7% were married couples living together, 7.5% had a female householder with no husband present, and 44.0% were non-families. 40.3% of all households were made up of individuals, and 25.8% had someone living alone who was 65 years of age or older. The average household size was 2.10 and the average family size was 2.79.

In the city, the population was spread out, with 21.1% under the age of 18, 4.8% from 18 to 24, 20.2% from 25 to 44, 21.6% from 45 to 64, and 32.3% who were 65 years of age or older. The median age was 48 years. For every 100 females, there were 86.3 males. For every 100 females age 18 and over, there were 83.7 males.

As of 2000 the median income for a household in the city was $27,672, and the median income for a family was $37,692. Males had a median income of $25,650 versus $20,909 for females. The per capita income for the city was $16,968. About 8.7% of families and 13.6% of the population were below the poverty line, including 23.1% of those under age 18 and 9.0% of those age 65 or over.

Education
Humboldt is served by Humboldt Table Rock Steinauer School District #70.

References

Cities in Nebraska
Cities in Richardson County, Nebraska